Rascians ( / Raši, Rašani) was a historical term for Serbs. The term was derived from the Latinized name for the central Serbian region of Raška. In medieval and early modern Western sources, exonym Rascia was often used as a designation for Serbian lands in general, and consequently the term Rasciani became one of the most common designations for Serbs. Because of the increasing migratory concentration of Serbs in the southern Pannonian Plain, since the late 15th century, those regions also became referred to as Rascia, since they were largely inhabited by Rasciani (Rascians). Among those regions, term Rascia (Raška) was most frequently used for territories spanning from western Banat to central Slavonia, including the regions of Syrmia, Bačka, and southern Baranja. From the 16th to the 18th century, those regions were contested between the Ottoman Empire and the Habsburg monarchy, and today they belong to several modern countries (Serbia, Romania, Hungary, Croatia).

In a wider perspective, the term was also used for some other related South Slavic groups of the Habsburg Monarchy, such as the Catholic Bunjevci and Šokci (designated as "Catholic Rascians").
Although they were certainly mostly Serbs, the term Rascians has wider meaning and includes all southern Slavs except Bulgarians. The reason for this is very mixed terminology of individual nations and ethnic groups immigrated to Hungary. They were distinguished by their religion as the "Catholic Rascians" Dalmatians, or as they are today called Bunjevci (which are they were originally from Dalmatia). People who were called Rascians later mostly self-identified as Serbs. In Hungary some Rascians saw themselves as Croats, mostly in villages of Tököl (Tukulja), Bátya (Baćin) and Dusnok (Dušnok).

Etymology
The name, primarily used by Hungarians and Germans, derived from the pars pro toto "Raška" (Rascia), a medieval Serbian region. The territory inhabited primarily by the Serbs in the Habsburg monarchy was called ; ; ; .

History

The defeats at the hand of the Ottoman Empire in the late 14th century forced the Serbs to rely on the neighbouring states, especially Hungary. After the Ottoman conquest of Serbian territories in 1439, Despot Đurađ Branković fled to the Kingdom of Hungary where he was given a large territory in southern Pannonia, while his son Grgur ruled Serbia as an Ottoman vassal until his removal in 1441. Đurađ's daughter Katarina of Celje (1434–56) held Slavonia. Having picked the losing side in the Hungarian civil war, the Branković dynasty were stripped of their estates in Hungary upon Matthias Corvinus' coronation in 1458. Left on its own, the Serbian Despotate lost the capital, Smederevo, to the Ottomans in 1459. Serbs migrated to Bosnia, Herzegovina, and Zeta, and in larger numbers to Hungary, where the immigrants were well-received. Many Hungarians left the frontier for the safer interior, leaving the southern Hungarian kingdom almost abandoned. The settlement of Serbs in Syrmia, Bačka, Banat and Pomorišje strengthened the Hungarian hold of these sparse areas, most exposed to Ottoman expansion.

Following the Ottoman conquest, a large part of the Serbian nobility were killed, while what survived crossed into Hungary, bringing their subjects, including many farmer families, with them. Matthias Corvinus complained in a letter from 1462 that 200,000 peoples during the previous three years had been taken from his country by Turks, this information was used as a reference for Serbian migration to Hungary.  King Matthias won over Vuk Grgurević in 1465 and proclaimed him a duke over Serbs in Syrmia and the surroundings, which intensified Serb migration; showing his military prowess with bands of Serb warriors, Vuk was proclaimed Serbian Despot in 1471 (thereby restoring the title). The Serbian Despot's army participated in the Ottoman-Hungarian Wars, penetrating into Ottoman territory, which saw large numbers of Serbs retreating with the Hungarian army. A letter of King Matthias from 12 January 1483 mentions that 200,000 Serbs had settled the Hungarian kingdom in the last four years. Despot Vuk and his warriors were greatly rewarded with estates, also including places in Croatia. Also, by this time, the Jakšić family had become increasingly notable, and held estates stretching over several counties in the kingdom. The territory of Vuk Grgurević (1471–85), the Serbian Despot in Hungarian service (as "Despot of the Kingdom of Rascia"), was called "Little Rascia".

Since the 15th century, the Serbs made up a large percentage of the population on the territory of present-day Vojvodina. Because of this, many historical sources and maps, which were written and drawn between 15th and 18th centuries, mention the territory under the names of Rascia (Raška, Serbia) and Little Rascia (Mala Raška, Little Serbia).

Between Ottomans and Habsburgs

After 1526, many Serbs (called "Rascians") settled in Slavonia. In 1526–27, Jovan Nenad ruled a territory of southern Pannonia during the Hungarian throne struggle; After his death (1527), his commander Radoslav Čelnik ruled Syrmia as an Ottoman and Habsburg vassal until 1532, when he retreated to Slavonia with the Ottoman conquest. Many of the Syrmian Serbs then settled the Kingdom of Hungary.

A 1542 document describes that "Serbia" stretched from Lipova and Timișoara to the Danube, while a 1543 document that Timișoara and Arad being located "in the middle of Rascian land" (in medio Rascianorum). At that time, the majority language in the region between Mureș and Körös was indeed Serbian. Apart from Serbian being the main language of the Banat population, there were 17 Serbian monasteries active in Banat at that time. The territory of Banat had received a Serbian character and was called "Little Rascia".

In early 1594, the Serbs in Banat rose up against the Ottomans, during the Long Turkish War (1593–1606) which was fought at the Austrian-Ottoman border in the Balkans. The Serbian patriarchate and rebels had established relations with foreign states, and had in a short time captured several towns, including Vršac, Bečkerek, Lipova, Titel and Bečej. The rebels had, in the character of a holy war, carried war flags with the icon of Saint Sava, the founder of the Serbian Orthodox Church and an important figure in medieval Serbia. The war banners had been consecrated by Patriarch Jovan Kantul, and the uprising had been aided by Serbian Orthodox metropolitans Rufim Njeguš of Cetinje and Visarion of Trebinje.

Because of the substantial number of Serbs (Rascians), who belonged to the Ottoman social and fiscal category of vlachs parts of the Sanjak of Pakrac and Sanjak of Požega were also referred to as Mala Vlaška. In the 17th and early 18th century, the territory of lower Slavonia was called Mala Raška, due to its large number of Serbs. In 17th-century Habsburg usage, the term "Rascian" referred most commonly to the Serbs who lived in Habsburg-controlled territory, then more generally to Orthodox Serbs, wherever they lived, and then more generally still to speakers of Serbian language. Throughout the 17th century, former counties of Požega, Baranya and Syrmia were often mentioned as "Rácország" (Hungarian term for the region of Rascians).

The Emperor's so-called "Invitatorium" in April 1690, for example, was addressed to Arsenije III as "Patriarch of the Rascians", but Austrian court style also distinguished between "Catholic Rascians" and "Orthodox Rascians". In 1695, Emperor Leopold issued a protective diploma for Patriarch Arsenije and the Serb people, whom he called "popolum Servianum" and "Rasciani seu Serviani".

18th century

In official Habsburg documents from the 18th century the Serbs of Habsburg Monarchy were mentioned as Rasciani ("Rascians"), Natio Rasciana ("Rascian nation"), Illyri ("Illyrians") and Natio Illyrica ("Illyrian nation").

During the Kuruc War (1703–1711) of Francis II Rakoczi, the territory of present-day Vojvodina was a battlefield between Hungarian rebels and local Serbs who fought on the side of the Habsburg Emperor. Darvas, the prime military commander of the Hungarian rebels, which fought against Serbs in Bačka, wrote: We burned all large places of Rascia, on the both banks of the rivers Danube and Tisa.

1801–48
When the representatives of the Vojvodinian Serbs negotiated with the Hungarian leader Lajos Kossuth in 1848, they asked him not to call them Raci, because they regard this name insulting, since they had their national and historical endonym – Serbs.

The initial name of the city of Novi Sad, Ratzen Stadt (Rascian/Serb City) derived from the name. The Tabán quarter of Budapest was also called Rácváros in the 18th-19th centuries due to its significant Serb population.

Since the 19th century, the term Rascians is no longer used.

Religion

After the Great Serb Migration, the Eparchy of Karlovac and Zrinopolje was established in 1695, the first metropolitan being Atanasije Ljubojević, the exiled metropolitan of Dabar and Bosnia.

Legacy
There is a Hungarian surname, Rác.

See also
 Serbs in Vojvodina
 History of Vojvodina
 History of Serbia
 History of the Serbs
 Eparchy of Požega
 Serbs of Croatia
 Serbs of Romania
 Serbs of Hungary
 Serbian Militia
 Serbian Free Corps

Maps

References

Sources

 
 
 Gavrilović, Vladan, and Dejan Mikavica. "Владавина права и грађанска равноправност срба у Хабзбуршкој монархији 1526-1792." Teme-Časopis za Društvene Nauke 04 (2013): 1643-1654.

External links

Vojvodina under Habsburg rule
Ottoman history of Vojvodina
History of the Serbs
Serbian Despotate
15th century in Serbia
16th century in Serbia
17th century in Serbia
18th century in Serbia
Croatia under Habsburg rule